The Rajajel Columns is an archaeological site of pillars carved from sandstone thought to be 6,000 years old. It is located in the Al Jawf Region in Saudi Arabia.  
Some of the existing columns are higher than three meters, while they are about 60 cm thick.

Etymology 
It is called "Rajajil" which means men because it looks like a man if it is seen from a distance.

Historical background 
The Rajajil columns may belong to a temple built in the fourth millennium BC. The site contains about 50 groups of erect stone pillars and several broken columns lying on the ground. These groups are distributed in a large circle overlooking a wide sandy plain. Each group includes two to ten columns, one of which is approximately three meters high.  Archaeologists believe that the site dates back to the fourth millennium BC. These columns are very similar to Stonehenge in Britain, which dates back to the third millennium BC. 

Current scholarly speculation suggests this site is a complex of different temples where human groups from outside the region visited to perform religious rituals.

Domat Al-Jandal Museum document 
A document found in the Dumat al-Jandal Museum indicates that the stone form of the columns may be related to ritual beliefs prevalent during the period of construction. The document indicates that the economic situation of the interior regions in the Arabian Peninsula, which are areas located to The south of the desert of Nafud remained, seemed unchanged until about the second millennium B.C. and represented in the practice of grazing livestock from goats, cows and sheep, in addition to relying on hunting and gathering food. The document adds that, in about 4000 BC, the influence of pottery and the practice of simple agriculture, hunting and grazing came to the north of the Arabian Peninsula. This civilization was established in the north of the Arabian Peninsula to form part of a broader civilization that extended during the fourth millennium BC Sinai, eastern Jordan, southern Syria, and western Iraq. It was called a metallic Stone Age civilization due to its discovery of the copper smelting method. This civilization is distinguished by the stone circles villages that may have been used for seasonal housing. The document refers to the site of Rajajeel by saying, "There is an exciting complex of stones and rubble near Sakakah is known as the Rajajil Columns and was an important center. It has similars in the Sinai."

The  Antiquities of the Rajajel columns 
Through the efforts of the General Administration of Antiquities and Museums, many archaeological sensors were discovered through excavation at the site of the Rajajil columns in 1396 AH-1397 AH (1975-1976). Also, man-made stone tools such as scrapers, broths, blades, and a small number of pottery pieces were discovered. These findings indicate the date of the site that dates back to the copper age in the fourth millennium BC.  There is similarity between Stonehenge in Britain and these Rajajeel Columns in Sakakah that date back to the third and second millennium BC. There are similarities between the columns of Rajajil in Al-Jawf, and between the patterns of stone circles found in Al-Qassim specifically located in the south of Shoaib Al-Atashan near the center of Hanizal in the north Buraidah.

References 

	
Mohamed Kacem, "A NEW VIEW ON THE MONUMENTS OF THE RAJAJIL SITE", Article 4, JGUAA, Volume 7, Issue 1, January 2022, Page 41-58. CF. DOI. 10.21608/JGUAA2.2021.93964.1076
 Ekhbarih Al-jouf : Rajajil columns complaining of neglect and vandalism after 6 thousand years [ broken link ]
 Riyadh newspaper: Rajajil columns dating back to the fourth millennium BC
 Ministry of Municipal and Rural Affairs. Al-Jawf Dora History, Archeology of Rajajil, page 8
 Archaeological and historical evidence in the Kingdom of Saudi Arabia, Muhammad bin Saud Al-Sandah, Part 1, i 1, 1414 AH / 1994 AD, pp. 66–67.
 Al-Jouf Land of Archeology and Civilization, Turki bin Ibrahim Al-Qahidan, 1st floor, Al-Rushd Library, Riyadh, 1425 AH / 2004AD, pp. 100–101.

Al-Jawf Province
Archaeological sites in Saudi Arabia